Babubhai Patel may refer to:
 Babubhai Patel (cricketer) (1911–?), Indian cricketer
 Babubhai Patel (politician), Indian politician
 Babubhai J. Patel (1911–2002), chief minister of Gujarat state in India